Crassula pellucida is a creeping, succulent ground-cover, or low-growing, spreading succulent shrub, indigenous to South Africa.

It is highly variable, tolerates shade, and several forms are popular in cultivation.

Description

The small ovate-rounded leaves have barely visible stalks, or are sessile (leaf-base fixed around the stem, without any stalk). This feature helps to distinguish this species from the similar and closely related Crassula spathulata.

The leaves have faintly toothed margins. Small, pink-white, star-shaped flowers appear in Autumn or late Summer.

Subspecies and distribution
 

 subsp. pellucida. This nominate subspecies has soft, green, rounded leaves. It occurs in shaded, rocky forested areas of the southern Cape, from Cape Town to East London. 
 subsp. brachypetala. This variable subspecies has hairs at the leaf-bases, and can sometimes have more pointed lanceolate leaves. It occurs widely across the eastern (summer-rainfall) half of South Africa. 
 subsp. marginalis. This unique subspecies has fused, disc-like leaf-pairs, densely packed along its pendent stems (looking similar to C.rupestris or C.perforata). It occurs in the far south-eastern Cape, from George to East London.

References

pellucida
Flora of the Cape Provinces